Edward Alan Wineland Jr. (born June 26, 1984) is an American retired mixed martial artist, who competed in the Bantamweight division of the Ultimate Fighting Championship (UFC). A professional competitor since 2003 until 2022, Wineland was the inaugural WEC Bantamweight Champion.

Background
Wineland was born in Houston, Texas, on June 26, 1984, and has one younger brother. Wineland grew up competing in wrestling and graduated from Chesterton High School in Porter County, Indiana, when he was 17 years old. He began his training for MMA with a friend at Duneland Vale Tudo. Two months later, Wineland fought a 37-year-old man and won. Wineland's brother is an inspiration for his fighting career. When his brother was two years old, he burned 98% of his body in an accident.

Mixed martial arts career

Early career
Wineland began his mixed martial arts career competing in regional organizations in his native Midwestern United States. He had compiled a total of 15 professional fights before signing with World Extreme Cagefighting.

World Extreme Cagefighting
Wineland became the inaugural WEC Bantamweight Champion after defeating Antonio Banuelos via first-round TKO at WEC 20. Wineland lost the title in his first defense against Chase Beebe by unanimous decision at WEC 26: Condit vs. Alessio.

Wineland was defeated by Rani Yahya via first round submission on April 5, 2009 at WEC 40.

Wineland defeated Manny Tapia via unanimous decision on October 10, 2009 at WEC 43.

Wineland was scheduled to face Rafael Rebello on January 10, 2010 at WEC 46, but Rebello was forced off the card with an injury and replaced by George Roop. He won via unanimous decision.

Wineland was scheduled to face Charlie Valencia on June 20, 2010 at WEC 49, but Valencia was forced off the card with an injury.  Wineland eventually faced Will Campuzano. Wineland defeated Campuzano via second-round TKO, earning Knockout of the Night honors.

Wineland was expected to face Damacio Page on November 11, 2010 at WEC 52. However, Wineland was forced out of the bout with a shoulder injury and replaced by Demetrious Johnson.

Wineland then faced Ken Stone on December 16, 2010 at WEC 53. He won via KO due to a slam in the first round, earning his second straight Knockout of the Night award.

Ultimate Fighting Championship
On October 28, 2010, World Extreme Cagefighting merged with the Ultimate Fighting Championship. As part of the merger, all WEC fighters were transferred to the UFC.

In his UFC debut, Wineland faced former WEC Featherweight Champion Urijah Faber on March 19, 2011 at UFC 128.  Wineland lost the back and forth fight via unanimous decision.

Wineland fought Joseph Benavidez on August 14, 2011 at UFC on Versus 5. He was defeated by Benavidez via unanimous decision.

Wineland was expected to face Demetrious Johnson on January 28, 2012 at UFC on Fox 2 However, on December 10, Dana White stated Johnson had been pulled from the bout and be a participant in the UFC's inaugural Flyweight tournament in March. Wineland was then expected to face Johnny Bedford.  However, Wineland himself was forced out of the bout with an injury and replaced by promotional newcomer Mitch Gagnon.

Wineland next faced Scott Jorgensen on June 8, 2012 at UFC on FX 3.  Wineland defeated Jorgenson via second-round knockout, notable for the fact it marked the first time the durable Jorgensen had been stopped via KO.  The performance earned both participants Fight of the Night honors.

Wineland faced Brad Pickett on December 29, 2012 at UFC 155.  Wineland defeated Pickett via split decision.

Wineland was expected to face then current Interim UFC Bantamweight Champion Renan Barão on June 15, 2013 at UFC 161.  However, on May 21 it was confirmed that Barão had pulled out if the bout, citing a foot injury.  With, Barão's departure, Wineland was removed from the card as well.

The bout with Barão eventually took place on September 21, 2013 at UFC 165. After winning the first round, Wineland lost the fight via TKO in the second round after he was dropped with a spinning kick and follow up flurry, forcing a referee stoppage.

Wineland faced Yves Jabouin at UFC on Fox 10.  Wineland won the fight via TKO in the second round.

Wineland faced Johnny Eduardo on May 10, 2014 at UFC Fight Night 40. He lost the fight via KO in the first round.

After over a year away from the sport, Wineland returned to face Bryan Caraway on July 25, 2015 at UFC on Fox 16. He lost the fight by unanimous decision.

Wineland next faced Frankie Saenz on July 23, 2016 at UFC on Fox 20. He won the back and forth fight via TKO in the third round and also earned a Performance on the Night bonus.

Wineland faced Takeya Mizugaki on December 17, 2016 at UFC on Fox 22. He won the fight via TKO in the first round.

Wineland next faced John Dodson on April 22, 2017 at UFC Fight Night 108. He lost the fight via unanimous decision.

Wineland faced Alejandro Pérez on July 14, 2018 at UFC Fight Night 133. He lost the fight via unanimous decision.

Wineland faced promotional newcomer Grigory Popov on June 8, 2019 at UFC 238. He won the fight via TKO in the second round.

Wineland was expected to face Marlon Vera on March 28, 2020 at UFC on ESPN: Ngannou vs. Rozenstruik. Due to the COVID-19 pandemic, the event was eventually postponed .

Wineland faced Sean O'Malley at UFC 250 on June 6. He lost the bout via first round knockout.

Wineland faced John Castañeda on February 20, 2021 at UFC Fight Night 185. He lost the fight via first round technical knockout.

Wineland faced Cody Stamann on June 18, 2022, at UFC on ESPN 37. He lost the fight via TKO in under a minute of the first round.

On June 19, 2022, Wineland announced his retirement in a post on social media which he wrote "I didn’t get an opportunity to leave my gloves in the cage but as Jim Morrison once sang this is the end". Wineland thanked the company, the match makers and the fans of which UFC president Dana White also said how Wineland was a "Another one that always will fight anyone, anywhere, anytime. Good dude. We like him a lot and wish him the best in his retirement."

Personal life
Wineland attended college for a year and a half and is a full-time firefighter in LaPorte, Indiana. He also works part-time for a maintenance company.
Wineland and his wife Amber have two children.

Championships and awards
Ultimate Fighting Championship
Fight of the Night (One time)
Performance of the Night (One time)
World Extreme Cagefighting
WEC Bantamweight Championship (One time, first)
Knockout of the Night (Two times)
Total Fight Challenge
TF Challenge Bantamweight Championship (One time)
Sherdog
2010 All-Violence 1st Team

Mixed martial arts record

|Loss
|align=center|24–16–1
|Cody Stamann
|TKO (punches)
|UFC on ESPN: Kattar vs. Emmett
|
|align=center|1
|align=center|0:59
|Austin, Texas, United States
|
|-
|Loss
|align=center|24–15–1
|John Castañeda
|TKO (punches)
|UFC Fight Night: Blaydes vs. Lewis 
|
|align=center|1
|align=center|4:44
|Las Vegas, Nevada, United States
|
|-
|Loss
|align=center|24–14–1
|Sean O'Malley
|KO (punch)
|UFC 250
|
|align=center|1
|align=center|1:54
|Las Vegas, Nevada, United States
|
|-
|Win
|align=center|24–13–1
|Grigory Popov
|KO (punches)
|UFC 238 
|
|align=center|2
|align=center|4:47
|Chicago, Illinois, United States
|
|-
|Loss
|align=center|23–13–1
|Alejandro Pérez
|Decision (unanimous)
|UFC Fight Night: dos Santos vs. Ivanov 
|
|align=center|3
|align=center|5:00
|Boise, Idaho, United States
|
|-
|Loss
|align=center|23–12–1
|John Dodson
|Decision (unanimous)
|UFC Fight Night: Swanson vs. Lobov
|
|align=center|3
|align=center|5:00
|Nashville, Tennessee, United States
|
|-
|Win
|align=center|23–11–1
|Takeya Mizugaki
|TKO (punches)
|UFC on Fox: VanZant vs. Waterson
|
|align=center|1
|align=center|3:04
|Sacramento, California, United States
| 
|-
|Win
|align=center|22–11–1
|Frankie Saenz
|TKO (punches)
|UFC on Fox: Holm vs. Shevchenko 
|
|align=center|3
|align=center|1:54
|Chicago, Illinois, United States
|
|-
| Loss
| align=center| 21–11–1
| Bryan Caraway
| Decision (unanimous)
| UFC on Fox: Dillashaw vs. Barão 2
| 
| align=center|3
| align=center|5:00
| Chicago, Illinois, United States
|
|-
| Loss
| align=center| 
| Johnny Eduardo
| KO (punches)
| UFC Fight Night: Brown vs. Silva
| 
| align=center| 1
| align=center| 4:37
| Cincinnati, Ohio, United States
| 
|-
| Win
| align=center| 21–9–1
| Yves Jabouin
| TKO (punches)
| UFC on Fox: Henderson vs. Thomson
| 
| align=center| 2
| align=center| 4:16
| Chicago, Illinois, United States
| 
|-
| Loss
| align=center| 20–9–1
| Renan Barão
| TKO (spinning back kick and punches)
| UFC 165
| 
| align=center| 2
| align=center| 0:35
| Toronto, Ontario, Canada
| 
|-
| Win
| align=center| 20–8–1 
| Brad Pickett
| Decision (split)
| UFC 155
| 
| align=center| 3
| align=center| 5:00
| Las Vegas, Nevada, United States
| 
|-
| Win
| align=center| 19–8–1 
| Scott Jorgensen
| KO (punches)
| UFC on FX: Johnson vs. McCall
| 
| align=center| 2
| align=center| 4:10
| Sunrise, Florida, United States
| 
|-
| Loss
| align=center| 18–8–1
| Joseph Benavidez
| Decision (unanimous)
| UFC Live: Hardy vs. Lytle
| 
| align=center| 3
| align=center| 5:00
| Milwaukee, Wisconsin, United States
| 
|-
| Loss
| align=center| 18–7–1
| Urijah Faber
| Decision (unanimous)
| UFC 128
| 
| align=center| 3
| align=center| 5:00
| Newark, New Jersey, United States
| 
|-
| Win
| align=center| 18–6–1
| Ken Stone
| KO (slam)
| WEC 53
| 
| align=center| 1
| align=center| 2:11
| Glendale, Arizona, United States
| 
|-
| Win
| align=center| 17–6–1
| Will Campuzano
| TKO (body punch)
| WEC 49
| 
| align=center| 2
| align=center| 4:44
| Edmonton, Alberta, Canada
| 
|-
| Win
| align=center| 16–6–1
| George Roop
| Decision (unanimous)
| WEC 46
| 
| align=center| 3
| align=center| 5:00
| Sacramento, California, United States
| 
|-
| Win
| align=center| 15–6–1
| Manny Tapia
| Decision (unanimous)
| WEC 43
| 
| align=center| 3
| align=center| 5:00
| San Antonio, Texas, United States
| 
|-
| Loss
| align=center| 14–6–1
| Rani Yahya
| Submission (rear-naked choke)
| WEC 40
| 
| align=center| 1
| align=center| 1:07
| Chicago, Illinois, United States
| 
|-
| Win
| align=center| 14–5–1
| Wade Choate
| TKO (punches)
| C3: Domination
| 
| align=center| 1
| align=center| 2:29
| Hammond, Indiana, United States
| 
|-
| Win
| align=center| 13–5–1
| Jason Tabor
| KO (punches)
| Total Fight Challenge 11
| 
| align=center| 2
| align=center| 4:42
| Hammond, Indiana, United States
| 
|-
| Loss
| align=center| 12–5–1
| Chase Beebe
| Decision (unanimous)
| WEC 26
| 
| align=center| 5
| align=center| 5:00
| Las Vegas, Nevada, United States
| 
|-
| Win
| align=center| 12–4–1
| Dan Swift
| Decision (unanimous)
| Total Fight Challenge 7
| 
| align=center| 2
| align=center| 5:00
| Hammond, Indiana, United States
| 
|-
| Win
| align=center| 11–4–1
| Antonio Banuelos
| KO (head kick and punches)
| WEC 20
| 
| align=center| 1
| align=center| 2:36
| Lemoore, California, United States
| 
|-
| Win
| align=center| 10–4–1
| Kurt Deeron
| TKO (punches)
| Duneland Classic 3
| 
| align=center| 2
| align=center| 2:26
| Portage, Indiana, United States
| 
|-
| Win
| align=center| 9–4–1
| Tim Norman
| Submission (rear-naked choke)
| Total Fight Challenge 5
| 
| align=center| 1
| align=center| 2:40
| Hammond, Indiana, United States
| 
|-
| Win
| align=center| 8–4–1
| Justin Hamm
| TKO (punches)
| ECF: Beatdown At The Fairgrounds 5
| 
| align=center| 2
| align=center| 4:55
| Indianapolis, Indiana, United States
| 
|-
| Win
| align=center| 7–4–1
| Christian Nielson
| Decision
| Courage Fighting Championships 4
| 
| align=center| 3
| align=center| 5:00
| Lincoln, Illinois, United States
| 
|-
| Win
| align=center| 6–4–1
| John Hosman
| Submission (rear-naked choke)
| IHC 9: Purgatory
| 
| align=center| 1
| align=center| 3:18
| Hammond, Indiana, United States
| 
|-
| Win
| align=center| 5–4–1
| Steve Hallock
| TKO (punches)
| Total Fight Challenge 4
| 
| align=center| 2
| align=center| 4:40
| Hammond, Indiana, United States
| 
|-
| Win
| align=center| 4–4–1
| Chad Washburn
| Submission (choke)
| Duneland Classic 2
| 
| align=center| 2
| align=center| N/A
| Portage, Indiana, United States
| 
|-
| Loss
| align=center| 3–4–1
| Brandon Carlson
| TKO (knee injury)
| XKK: Xtreme Cage Combat
| 
| align=center| N/A
| align=center| N/A
| Curtiss, Wisconsin, United States
| 
|-
| Loss
| align=center| 3–3–1
| Jim Bruketta
| Submission (rear-naked choke)
| Total Martial Arts Challenge 2
| 
| align=center| 1
| align=center| N/A
| Hammond, Indiana, United States
| 
|-
| Win
| align=center| 3–2–1
| Tim Panicucci
| TKO (punches)
| Freestyle Combat Challenge 14
| 
| align=center| 1
| align=center| 4:56
| Racine, Wisconsin, United States
| 
|-
| Win
| align=center| 2–2–1
| Omar Choudhury
| KO (knee)
| Freestyle Combat Challenge 13
| 
| align=center| 2
| align=center| 2:25
| Racine, Wisconsin, United States
| 
|-
| Loss
| align=center| 1–2–1
| Stonnie Dennis
| Submission (heel hook)
| HOOKnSHOOT: HOOKnSHOOT
| 
| align=center| 1
| align=center| 1:53
| Evansville, Indiana, United States
| 
|-
| Loss
| align=center| 1–1–1
| Mustafa Hussaini
| Submission (armbar)
| Extreme Challenge 51
| 
| align=center| 2
| align=center| 1:21
| St. Charles, Illinois, United States
| 
|-
| Draw
| align=center| 1–0–1
| Mustafa Hussaini
| Draw
| Shooto: Midwest Fighting
| 
| align=center| 2
| align=center| 5:00
| Hammond, Indiana, United States
| 
|-
| Win
| align=center| 1–0
| Joel Cleverly
| Submission
| Maximum Combat 6
| 
| align=center| 1
| align=center| 3:10
| Fort Wayne, Indiana, United States
| 
|-

See also
 List of male mixed martial artists

Notes

References

External links

1984 births
American firefighters
American male mixed martial artists
Bantamweight mixed martial artists
Mixed martial artists utilizing wrestling
Mixed martial artists utilizing Brazilian jiu-jitsu
Living people
Mixed martial artists from Indiana
American male sport wrestlers
Amateur wrestlers
American practitioners of Brazilian jiu-jitsu
People from Chesterton, Indiana
People from LaPorte County, Indiana
Sportspeople from Houston
Ultimate Fighting Championship male fighters
World Extreme Cagefighting champions